Gabrje is a village in the foothills of the Gorjanci Range in the City Municipality of Novo Mesto in southeastern Slovenia, close to the border with Croatia. The entire area is part of the traditional region of Lower Carniola and is now included in the Southeast Slovenia Statistical Region.

The local church is dedicated to John the Baptist and belongs to the Parish of Brusnice. It was built in the late 15th to early 16th centuries. Its three gilded altars date to the 17th century.

References

External links

Gabrje on Geopedia

Populated places in the City Municipality of Novo Mesto